HMS Carron was one of thirty-two  destroyers built for the Royal Navy during the Second World War, a member of the eight-ship Ca sub-class. Commissioned in late 1944, she was assigned to the Home Fleet and escorted the fleet's larger ships during operations off German-occupied Norway. Carron was sold for scrap in 1967.

Design and description
The Ca sub-class was a repeat of the preceding .

The ships were powered by a pair of geared steam turbines, each driving one propeller shaft using steam provided by two Admiralty three-drum boilers. Their complement comprised 186 officers and ratings.

The main armament of the destroyers consisted of four QF  Mk IV dual-purpose guns, one superfiring pair each fore and aft of the superstructure protected by partial gun shields. Their anti-aircraft suite consisted of one twin-gun stabilised Mk IV "Hazemeyer" mount for  Bofors guns amidships and two twin and a pair of single mounts for six  Oerlikon AA guns. The ships were also fitted with two quadruple mounts amidships for 21-inch (533 mm) torpedo tubes. For anti-submarine work, they were equipped with a pair of depth charge rails and four throwers for 108 depth charges.

Construction and career
Carron was laid down by Scotts at their shipyard in Greenock on 26 November 1942 with the name of Strenuous and was launched on 28 March 1944 by which time she had been renamed. She was commissioned on 6 November and was allocated to the 6th Destroyer Flotilla for service with the Home Fleet. After a refit in mid-1945 to augment her anti-aircraft armament, she was transferred for service in the Far East in June, but joined the East Indies Fleet at Trincomalee, British Ceylon, in August.

Post war service
Following the war Carron paid off into reserve.  She was the first of her class to be selected for modernistion and the work was completed at Chatham. Work included a new bridge and gunnery fire control system, as well as the addition of Squid anti-submarine mortars.  The ship emerged from modernisation in 1955 for service with the Dartmouth Training Squadron. Her 'B' gun turret was replaced by a charthouse. In 1960 the ship was further de-equipped so she could serve as a navigational training ship, with only her torpedo tubes remaining and further charthouses fitted on the Squid deck. Carron was paid off on 5 April 1963 and was listed for sale on 30 May. She was sold for scrap to Thos. W. Ward on 10 March 1967 and arrived at the breaker's yard in Inverkeithing on 31 March.

References

Bibliography
 
 
 
 
 
 
 
 
 
 

 

World War II destroyers of the United Kingdom
Cold War destroyers of the United Kingdom
1944 ships
Ships built on the River Clyde
C-class destroyers (1943) of the Royal Navy